Dundas is an unincorporated community located in the town of Woodville, Calumet County, Wisconsin, United States.

History
A post office called Dundas was first established in 1846. The community was supposedly named by an early settler who had returned from the island of Dundas off the east coast of Africa. The community may also have been named by the first postmaster, David H. Halsted, for William H. Dundas who was the chief clerk of the Post Office Department at the time.

Notable people
Walter F. Truettner (1881-1967), Michigan Senate member, born in Dundas
Joseph Wolfinger, Wisconsin State Representative, businessman, and inventor, lived in Dundas.

Notes

Unincorporated communities in Calumet County, Wisconsin
Unincorporated communities in Wisconsin
Appleton–Fox Cities metropolitan area